This list contains all cultural property of national significance (class A) in the canton of Aargau from the 2009 Swiss Inventory of Cultural Property of National and Regional Significance. It is sorted by municipality and contains 175 individual buildings, 11 collections and 56 archaeological finds.

The geographic coordinates provided are in the Swiss coordinate system as given in the Inventory.

Aarau

Aarburg

Ammerswil

Auw

Baden

Bad Zurzach

Beinwil (Freiamt)

Beinwil am See

Besenbüren

Biberstein

Birr

Boswil

Böttstein

Bözberg

Bremgarten (AG)

Brugg

Büttikon

Densbüren

Dietwil

Effingen

Endingen

Fisibach

Fischbach-Göslikon

Frick

Full-Reuenthal

Geltwil

Gipf-Oberfrick

Gontenschwil

Gränichen

Habsburg

Hellikon

Hendschiken

Herznach

Hornussen

Hunzenschwil

Jonen

Kaiseraugst

Kaiserstuhl

Kaisten

Kallern

Klingnau

Koblenz

Kölliken

Künten

Laufenburg

Leimbach

Lengnau

Lenzburg

Leuggern

Leutwil

Magden

Mandach

Meisterschwanden

Mellingen

Menziken

Merenschwand

Mettauertal

Möhlin

Möriken-Wildegg

Mumpf

Muri

Niederlenz

Niederwil

Oberkulm

Oberlunkhofen

Obersiggenthal

Oftringen

Olsberg

Othmarsingen

Rheinfelden

Rümikon

Rupperswil

Sarmenstorf

Schafisheim

Schinznach-Bad

Schinznach

Schöftland

Schupfart

Schwaderloch

Seengen

Seon

Sins

Spreitenbach

Staufen

Stein

Suhr

Sulz

Tegerfelden

Thalheim

Unterkulm

Unterlunkhofen

Untersiggenthal

Veltheim

Villigen

Villmergen

Villnachern

Wallbach

Wegenstetten

Wettingen

Windisch

Wittnau

Wölflinswil

Wohlen

Würenlingen

Würenlos

Zeihen

Zeiningen

Zofingen

References
 All entries, addresses and coordinates are from:

External links
 Swiss Inventory of Cultural Property of National and Regional Significance, 2009 edition:

PDF documents: Class B objects
Geographic information system

Aargau
 
Buildings and structures in the canton of Vaud
Tourist attractions in the canton of Vaud